No. 20 Squadron  (Lightnings) is a fighter squadron. It is equipped with Sukhoi Su-30MKI and based at Lohegaon Air Force Station, Pune.

History
The Lightnings stuck with tremendous impact during the December 1971 operations. A decade later, No. 20 Squadron were chosen to form the IAF's formation aerobatic team given the appellation of "Thunderbolts".

The IAF's most decorated squadron, No.20 Lightnings, was re-commissioned from its number plated status to operational status. Its pilots and crews were mainly drawn from the first Sukhoi squadron, No. 24 Squadron IAF 'Hunting Hawks,' and have considerable experience on the type. This squadron is considered one of the parent squadrons of the Sukhoi 30 MKI in the IAF. Also the No.20 Squadron played an important role in making the Flankers fully operational in the Indian Air Force.

Aircraft

Aircraft types operated by the squadron

References

020